Jason Ryan may refer to:

 Jason Ryan (baseball) (born 1976), retired Major League Baseball pitcher
 Jason Ryan (Gaelic footballer) (born 1976), Irish Gaelic football manager and former player
 Jason Ryan (rugby league), Australian former rugby league player
 Jason Ryan, crown witness against Pettingill family members, see Walsh Street police shootings

See also
 Jay Ryan (disambiguation)